Veera Desai Road is a part of Andheri – the largest of Mumbai's suburbs in the state of Maharashtra, India. It is also linked to some famous landmarks of Andheri i.e. Andheri Recreation Club, Andheri Sports Complex – where most national level sports tournaments are held, Garden Court restaurant, Sony Mony Electronics, Sardar Patel College of Engineering (SPCE) – one of the top ranked engineering colleges, S.P. Jain Institute of Management and Research, Bhavan's College. n. There are some old housing colonies belonging to bank of India employees, these are Pallavi, Ajanta, Aradhana, Sanmaan, Om Pushpanjalietc. Veera Desai Road has been one of the better neighbourhoods to live in Mumbai. In recent years it has seen exponential developments resulting in a healthy blend of Residential apartments housing Bank and Govt employees alongside the new and swanky Offices in modern office complex. 

Veera Desai Road was originally constructed and maintained by a stone quarry named Veera Desai & Company in the year 1954. There was no population in the area besides people working in the quarry. One of the partners named Govindji Vasanji Desai lived on site among the other partners named Shyamji Dahyabhai Veera and Vallabhji Dahyabhai Veera. The road was later taken over by Bombay Municipality to develop and then officially named as Veera Desai Road. 

Some years back this area also saw the construction of an Olympic size Swimming pool and a giant outdoor tournament stadium.
A major part of Veera Desai rd has grown over the last 40 yrs by reclaiming land from the then backwaters of Mumbai.

Mahalakshmi Society and MVM Schools are one of the oldest known places to all—its entrance begins with the Andheri Sports Complex. The sports complex is famous for various international events including Michael Jackson, Jon Bon Jovi and World Wrestling Federation (WWF) matches.

Lately this area is going through lot of constructions.

All old buildings are in a verge of going through redevelopment phase. This area is also known as a Banking hub, as many banks like HDFC, ICICI, Saraswat Co-Operative, Standard Chartered, Mogveera, Shamrao Vithal etc. have surrounded this area. There are almost 4–5 big shopping malls, multiplexes, media houses and leading brand car showrooms around Veera Desai Road. Many new restaurants, bakeries and pubs have made it a popular hangout spot for people. In spite of all this it has kept its old charm as it is. Most important it has become place where you will get peace of mind.

The people living here include actors like Muni Jha, Sejal Jha film maker Shekhar Ramesh Mishra, singer Arijit Singh. Top Class Chartered accountants are living in this area

Roads in Mumbai